Procore Technologies is an American construction management software as a service company founded in 2002, with headquarters in Carpinteria, California.

History 
Founder and CEO Craig "Tooey" Courtemanche created the software that became Procore as a response to his struggles to manage the construction of his new home in Santa Barbara, from his then-home in Silicon Valley. The app he built tracked the activity of the workers onsite. Founded in 2002, the company was originally headquartered in Montecito, California. Steve Zahm, founder of the e-learning company DigitalThink, joined Procore as president in 2004.

Procore's revenue in 2012 was $4.8 million. In 2020, it was $400 million.

The company initially filed to go public in 2019, with plans to launch the IPO in 2020, but delayed the offering due to the coronavirus pandemic. Procore stock began trading under stock ticker PCOR on May 20, 2021 at $67 per share. The initial public offering raised $634.5 million. Following the IPO, the company was valued at nearly $11 billion. As of May 2021, the company has over 10,000 customers, and over 1.6 million users of its products in more than 125 countries.

Procore's campus is on a 9-acre oceanfront property in Carpinteria, California.

Investors and acquisitions
In 2014, Bessemer Venture Partners led a $15 million investment round. In 2015, the company raised an additional $30 million in a round led by Bessemer and Iconiq Capital. In 2015, the Wall Street Journal reported the company to be worth "$500 million post-money." In 2016, the company raised $50 million in a round led by Iconiq, reaching a $1 billion valuation. In 2018, the company raised an additional $75 million, and in 2020, it raised over $150 million. In total, the company raised nearly $500 million from 2007 through its IPO in 2021.

In July 2019, Procore acquired US project management software group Honest Buildings. In October 2020, it acquired US estimating software provider Esticom. Procore acquired construction artificial intelligence companies Avata Intelligence in 2020, and INDUS.AI in 2021.

Software 
Procore's cloud-based construction management software allows teams of construction companies, property owners, project managers, contractors, and partners to collaborate on construction projects and share access to documents, planning systems and data, using an Internet-connected device. Data and video can also be streamed in to the system via drones. The software includes features such as meeting minutes, drawing markups and document storage for all project-related materials.

Procore's offerings also include an app marketplace, with 300+ partners, including Box, an enterprise file storage and content management company; Botlink, a joint venture by Packet Digital that allows users to stream in both video and data from drones surveying their construction projects; and Dexter + Chaney, an ERP provider.

In 2015, software review company Software Advice ranked Procore the #1 most popular construction software, based on the number of users, search traffic, and social media presence. In 2018, Forbes wrote that the Procore app is the most popular software in the US construction industry. It was ranked number 5 on the Forbes Cloud 100 list in 2018, number 6 in 2019, and number 8 in 2020.

References

Software companies based in California
Construction software
Architectural communication
Construction documents
Software companies of the United States
2002 establishments in California
Software companies established in 2002
American companies established in 2002
2021 initial public offerings
Companies listed on the New York Stock Exchange
Cloud computing providers